Mitromorpha cachiai is a species of sea snail, a marine gastropod mollusk in the family Mitromorphidae.

Description
The length of the shell varies between 4 mm and 6 mm.

Distribution
This marine species occurs off the Canary Islands.

References

 Mifsud, C., 2001 The genus Mitromorpha Carpenter, 1865 and its subgenera with European species, p. 32 pp

External links
 
 

cachiai
Gastropods described in 2001